I Am the Phoenix is the title of the third album by the British singer-songwriter Judie Tzuke, released in 1981. It peaked at no.17 on the UK Album Chart.

Originally released on vinyl and cassette by Elton John's record label named The Rocket Record Company, the album was reissued on CD in 2000 by Tzuke's own record company, Big Moon Records, with new cover artwork.

Track listing
Side one
 "Black Furs" (Judie Tzuke, Mike Paxman) – 4:30
 "Higher and Higher" (Paul Muggleton, Bob Noble) – 4:35
 "Fate's Wheels" (Muggleton, Noble) – 4:59
 "Come Hell or Waters High" (Muggleton) – 3:14
 "You Were the Place" (Tzuke, Paxman) – 4:58

Side two
"City of Swimming Pools" (Tzuke, Paxman) – 5:39
 "You Are the Phoenix" (Muggleton, Noble) – 4:39
 "The Flesh Is Weak" (John Edwards, Muggleton, Noble, Paxman, Jeff Rich, Tzuke) – 5:10 
 "I Never Know Where My Heart Is" (Tzuke, Paxman, Muggleton) – 5:16

Personnel
Band members
Judie Tzuke – vocals
Mike Paxman – guitars
Bob Noble – keyboards
John Edwards – bass
Charlie Morgan – drums
Jeff Rich – drums on tracks 5, 6, 8, 9
Paul Muggleton – background vocals, producer

Additional musicians
Andy Clark – additional keyboards, synthesizer arrangement on "Come Hell or Waters High"
Martin Ditcham – percussion
Eugene Organ, Mike Rogers – acoustic guitars
Paul Buckmaster – string arrangements
Gavyn Wright – strings leader

Production
Steve Taylor – engineer
Howard Gray – assistant engineer
Keith McEwan – art direction, illustration

References

Judie Tzuke albums
1981 albums
Albums arranged by Paul Buckmaster
The Rocket Record Company albums